The Gouffé Case, also known as the Gouffé trunk, Miller's bloody trunk or the Eyraud-Bompard affair was an 1889 murder case which unfolded in France. On 26 July 1889, bailiff Toussaint-Augustin Gouffé of Montmartre, Paris, was reported missing. Two weeks later, Gouffé's corpse was found 300 miles (480km) away, near Millery village, a suburb of Lyon. The case marked a milestone in the use of forensic pathology and forensic science in criminal investigations, and the trial of Gouffé's accused killers, Michel Eyraud and Gabrielle Bompard, captured the attention of the French press.

Case reveal

On 13 August, 1889, roadmender Denis Coffy received a complaint of a bad smell on the secondary road in Vernaison, Millery, a suburb of Lyon. A large oilskin cloth bag, emitting a foul smell, was found under a bush. Inside the bag authorities found a body, which was then taken in for forensic investigation  a novel practice for the time.

A forensic surgeon, Paul Bernard, undertook an autopsy on 14 August. He reported that the naked body was bound with seven meters of rope, the head was enveloped in a black oilskin cloth and that the victim had obviously died by strangulation three to five weeks before. Three months later, on 13 November 1889, the body was examined by doctor Alexandre Lacassagne in a procedure which lasted a week. The body was identified as belonging to Toussaint-Augustin Gouffé based on a sample of hair taken from Gouffé's comb  also a novel practice at the time  and the description of an old back injury in his missing person's report. Gouffé, a 49-year-old court bailiff, had kept a study at 148 Montmartre, Paris. He was described as a respectable widower, properly raising his two daughters, but also said to be somewhat of a womaniser.

Two days after the discovery of Gouffé's body, another abandoned trunk, noticed by a trader of snails, was found in Saint-Genis-Laval. The key fitted to the lock, a missing nail was similar with a nail found in Millery and the stench from the chest left no doubt about its prior usage. A tag glued to the one of the boards imparted that the trunk travelled from Paris to Lyon by rail, on 27 July 1888 or 1889 (the last figure was unreadable}. The registers of the railway company Chemins de fer de Paris à Lyon et à la Méditerranée (PLM) insured that 1889 was the precise year, and this date corresponded with Gouffé's disappearance. The prosecutor of Lyon decided to transmit elements in his possession to the ministère public in Paris, which entrusted the inquiry to Commissioner Marie-François Goron of the Sûreté nationale. Inspectors explored Gouffé's habits and relationships, and realized that he frequently socialized with a couple of swindlers, Michel Eyraud and his mistress Gabrielle Bompard, just prior to his disappearance. Eyraud and Bompard hurriedly left Paris on 27 July 1889, two days before Gouffé was reported missing by his brother-in-law. On 29 November, one of the first Interpol notices was broadcast against Eyraud and Bompard. Suspicion was confirmed when a carpenter in London identified the trunk, which he sold the couple.

Investigation

On 26 July, Bompard pretended to accidentally meet Gouffé in a Parisian cafe and encouraged him to visit her at a flat, located on Tronson-du-Coudray street in the 8th arrondissement, which she rented with Eyraud. There, having flirtatiously invited Gouffé to sit down on a deckchair, she wound around his neck the cord of a dressing gown. Eyraud, who hid behind a curtain, caught the cord and garroted Gouffé. When the victim resisted, Eyraud, thrown into a panic, sprang out of the hiding-place and strangled him with his hands. During the interrogation, Eyraud claimed that it was Bompard who strangled Gouffé.

Having been unable to extract money from Gouffé before his murder, Eyraud and Bompard tried to get rid of the body. They put him in the trunk they had purchased in London and sent the trunk to Lyon via the PLM. At Lyon railway station they recovered the bulky luggage and rented an automobile to transport it. When the 105 kg trunk became too heavy for them and the smell of putrefaction became overwhelming, they left it on the road of Millery. The couple then left for the United States.

Perpetrators

Michel Eyraud was born in Saint-Étienne on 30 March 1843, was the son of merchants. He married a 19-year-old girl on March 17, 1870, but he proved a violent, fickle husband and soon left his wife to take up a career of "adventurer". In 1863 he became involved once in the French Army and gained the rank of corporal of Jägers during the Maximilian Affair, before walking out of the military. Afterward Eyraud engaged in criminal activities involving fraud.

Gabrielle Bompard was born in 1868, The daughter of an easy metal trader of the north of France, Bompard was described as being small and rather nice but having a confusing character, perhaps due to a youth spoilt by a selfish father. In spite of her youth, she was nevertheless dragged down by her a reputation for debauchery.

Arrest and process (trial)
Bompard left Eyraud in San Francisco and came back to France, where she was imprisoned on 22 January 1890. First she disclaimed any participation in Gouffé's murder, but she ended up cracking and started to tell everything in detail. Meanwhile, Eyraud continued his living by engaging in fraudulent activities between the US, Canada and Mexico. In June 1890, having avoided French policemen on several occasions, he was finally arrested in Havana.

Both criminals were judged in December 1890. Although defended by the famous lawyer Félix Decori, Eyraud was sentenced to death. He was guillotined on 3 February 1891, by the executioner Louis Deibler.

Mister Henry-Robert, Bompard's lawyer, pleaded that his client was subjected by Eyraud by means of hypnosis, a very popular practice of the period, and had been his involuntary accomplice. Because of extenuating circumstances, Bompard was given a comparatively merciful sentence of twenty years of hard labour, which she spent in the female prison of Nanterre, then in Clermont dungeon in Oise. She was liberated in 1905, before the term of her penalty, having benefited from several reductions of penalty for good conduct. She continued her occupation of dance. Her past inspired the public for the lament Gabrielle Bompard. Bompard died in obscurity around the early 1920s.

Literature
Commissioner Marie-François Goron retired in 1933 after forty-eight years of service, and his memoirs became a precursor for the work of Detective and criminalist François Vidocq. During sixteen years, the public was roused with twenty-one books about braggart policeman, one of which narrated about the Gouffé Case.

See also
 Bonnie and Clyde
 Causality
 Criminology
 Detective fiction
 Environmental criminology
 Forensic science
 Hypnosis
 Probable cause
 Statistical correlations of criminal behaviour

Bibliography
 Eyraud and Bompard 
 Bataille «Causes Criminelles et Mondaines» 1890.
 L’Affaire Gouffe by Dr. Lacassagne, Lyons, 1891.
 Goron «L’Amour Criminel»
 Régine Plas. Hysteria, Hypnosis, and Moral Sense in French 19th-Century Forensic Psychiatry: The Eyraud-Bompard Case // International Journal of Law and Psychiatry, Volume 21, Issue 4, Autumn 1998, Pages 397—407.

References

External links
 Le meurtre de l'huissier Gouffé 

1889 in France
Trials in France
Murder in France
1889 murders in France